Luge at the 2016 Winter Youth Olympics took place at the Lillehammer Olympic Bobsleigh and Luge Track venue in Lillehammer, Norway.

Medal summary

Medal table

Events

Qualification system
The rankings from the 2014–15 and 2015–16 Junior Luge world cup were used to qualify entries. Every nation was guaranteed one sled in each event if they met the minimum standard. If there were more sled then quotas then the world cup rankings were used. The maximum total for an NOC was six athletes (2 boys, 2 girls and one doubles), with a maximum total of 20 athletes in the singles and 15 in the doubles. If the host nation would not qualify, the last quota spot would be awarded to Austria. If an event would not have enough qualifiers, the quota spots left over were allocated to the other events equally. A nation could enter the team event if it has qualified an athlete in each event. If spots were reallocated, first priority would be given to nations that have not qualified an athlete yet. A country qualifying in all events may enter the team relay, along with countries made up of athletes from a maximum of 2 athletes.

Qualification summary
The following is the quota summary. In this case only 13 sleds were eligible in the doubles, meaning each individual event received 2 additional quotas.

References

External links
Results Book – Luge

 
2016 in luge
2016 Winter Youth Olympics events
2016
Luge in Norway